Default file system used in various operating systems.

See also 
 List of file systems
 Comparison of file systems
 List of partition IDs (MBR)
 Master Boot Record (MBR)
 GUID Partition Table (GPT)
 Apple Partition Map
 Amiga Rigid Disk Block
 Timeline of DOS operating systems
 History of Microsoft Windows
 FDISK

References 

Computer file systems
Computing-related lists